Frederic Mayer (21 April 1931 – 20 March 2013) was an American operatic tenor who was active mostly in Germany, especially at the Staatstheater am Gärtnerplatz, Munich, where he was a member of the company for nearly thirty years.

Further reading 
 Karl-Josef Kutsch, Leo Riemens: Großes Sängerlexikon. Fourth, extended edition. Munich 2003. volume 4: Kainz–Menkes, .

References

External links 
 Mayer, Frederic David on Munich University
 
 Frederic Mayer – Tondokument (aus Der Silbersee)
 

1931 births
2013 deaths
People from Lincoln, Nebraska
American operatic tenors
American emigrants to Germany